Guanine nucleotide-binding protein G(I)/G(S)/G(O) subunit gamma-2 is a protein that in humans is encoded by the GNG2 gene.

Heterotrimeric G proteins play vital roles in cellular responses to external signals. The specificity of a G protein-receptor interaction is primarily mediated by the gamma subunit.[supplied by OMIM]

Interactive pathway map

References

Further reading